The 1839 Ava earthquake, also known as the Amarapura earthquake or Inwa earthquake was a disastrous seismic event that struck central Burma on the morning of March 23. This earthquake with a moment magnitude as high as 8.3, was one of the biggest in the country since 1762. Shaking reached XI (Extreme) on the Modified Mercalli intensity scale, and was felt in Rangoon and Bhamo.

Tectonic setting
Burma is wedged between four tectonic plates; the Indian, Eurasian, Sunda and Burma plates that interact due to active geological processes. Along the west coast of the Coco Islands, off the Rahkine coast, and into Bangladesh, is a highly oblique convergent boundary known as the Sunda megathrust. This large fault marks the boundary between the Indian and Burma plates. The megathrust emerges from the seafloor in Bangladesh, where it runs parallel and east of the Chin Hills. This boundary continues to north of Burma where it ends at the eastern Himalayas.

The Sagaing Fault is a mostly continental transform fault that runs through Burma and connects the Andaman spreading center to the collision zone in the north. It accommodates motion between the Burma and Sunda Plates as they slide past each other at a rate of 18 to 49 mm/yr. The fault runs the entire length of the country for over 1,200 km and continues its trace into the Andaman Sea. The Sagaing Fault is Burma's largest and most active source of seismic threat, running through or close to major cities like Yangon, Nay Pyi Daw and Mandalay. Several large and damaging earthquakes have occurred on this fault in historical times.

Earthquake
The Sagaing Fault is a major transform boundary that runs through Myanmar, and is the source of the earthquake. The earthquake epicenter is presently located just outside the city of Mandalay. There is no official magnitude presented for this earthquake but most news media and research journals put the figure at 7.0–7.5 or ≥8.0 . Remote sensing and field observation revealed a maximum displacement of  along the trace of the 1839 rupture just outside Mandalay. This would place the magnitude at 7.4–8.0+, and generate an earthquake rupture of at least .

Ten years later, in 1956, a magnitude 7.1 earthquake struck close to the city of Mandalay, re-rupturing the 1839 rupture zone for about 60 km. Meanwhile, the 260 km long Meiktila segment has not experienced any major earthquake since 1839 and is considered a seismic gap.

Foreshocks
The mainshock was preceded by a large foreshock in 1838 which also damaged the capital.

Damage and effects 
Great damage was reported in Inwa, so severe that the formal capital was moved to nearby Amarapura. In Mingun, a stupa sustained serious damage as a result of shaking. British officials in Myanmar recorded catastrophic damage and liquefaction in Mandalay and the surrounding area. Many pagodas collapsed during the event. Some villages were swallowed up as a result of liquefaction. By a contemporary British estimate 300–400 people were killed. The shock also reversed the flow of the Irrawaddy River, where the currents became violent and overflowed its banks. It was felt for thousands of miles away from the epicenter, as far as Dacca, Calcutta and Bangkok.

Gallery

See also
List of earthquakes in Myanmar
List of historical earthquakes

References 

Earthquakes in Myanmar
1839 in Asia
History of Myanmar
Earthquakes in Asia
19th century in Burma
British rule in Burma
1839 earthquakes
1839 natural disasters
1839 disasters in Asia
Strike-slip earthquakes